Pseudophoxinus zeregi, also known as the Levantine spring minnow, is a species of ray-finned fish in the family Cyprinidae.
It is found in Turkey and Syria.
Its natural habitat is rivers.
The species of Pseudophoxinus zeregi is threatened by extinction because of rapid habitat loss.

Sources

Pseudophoxinus
Endemic fauna of Turkey
Fish of Asia
Fish described in 1843
Taxonomy articles created by Polbot